Sunaina Sunaina (20 April 1980) is an Indian weightlifter.

Sunaina won three bronze medals at the 2002 Commonwealth Games in the 58 kg snatch, 58 kg clean and jerk and 58 kg total events.

References

1980 births
Living people
Indian female weightlifters
Weightlifters at the 2002 Commonwealth Games
Commonwealth Games bronze medallists for India
Commonwealth Games medallists in weightlifting
20th-century Indian women
21st-century Indian women
Medallists at the 2002 Commonwealth Games